"For All We Know" is a popular song published in 1934, with music by J. Fred Coots and lyrics by Sam M. Lewis.  Popular versions in 1934 were by Hal Kemp (vocal by Skinnay Ennis) and Isham Jones (vocal by Joe Martin).

Background
There are alternative verses but the main lyrics start: "For all we know we may never meet again...".

Other artists' recordings
 1958 Billie Holiday 1958 Lady in Satin album By Columbia Records
The version by Dinah Washington reached No. 88 on the chart in 1962. 
A version by The Spinners in 1965 gave it a more contemporary sound and was included in the 1967 LP The Original Spinners.
The Donny Hathaway version from the LP Roberta Flack & Donny Hathaway (Atlantic, 1972) has become one of the standout versions of the song.
A version by jazz pianist Bill Evans was recorded in his last studio album We Will Meet Again (Warner Bros. Records, 1979).
The song has been recorded by a host of artists, including: Nina Simone, Al Martino, The Andrews Sisters, Aretha Franklin, Billie Holiday, Chet Baker,   Crystal Gayle, Dinah Washington, Doris Day, Joanie Sommers, Fran Jeffries, Bette Midler, Nat King Cole, Rod Stewart, June Christy, Ruben Studdard, Frankie Valli, Caleb Kelly and Rosemary Clooney
Jane Ira Bloom included the song in her 2013 album Sixteen Sunsets.
Jennifer Hudson sang a rendition of the song at the All Star Game tribute to Gianna and Kobe Bryant in 2020.

Song in popular culture
The Rosemary Clooney version is heard over the closing credits of Dan Ireland's 2005 British film Mrs. Palfrey at the Claremont.
The Bette Midler version was featured in the 1991 film For the Boys.
A cover by Abbey Lincoln was featured prominently in the Gus Van Sant film Drugstore Cowboy (1989).
An instrumental version, and a Barbra Streisand vocal version, are featured in the 1991 film The Prince of Tides.
The Billie Holiday version is featured in the 1995 film Forget Paris.
Johnny Hartman's version was featured in the Clint Eastwood movie The Bridges of Madison County (1995).
A cover by Billy Porter and Our Lady J was featured in a 2018 episode of Pose.

References

1934 songs
Aretha Franklin songs
Barbra Streisand songs
Doris Day songs
Jay and the Americans songs
Nat King Cole songs
Nina Simone songs
Ray Charles songs
Roberta Flack songs
Rod Stewart songs
Rosemary Clooney songs
Songs with lyrics by Sam M. Lewis
Songs with music by John Frederick Coots
Pop standards